The 2020 Western Athletic Conference men's soccer season will be the 38th season of men's varsity soccer in the conference. The regular season will begin on February 3, 2021 and conclude on April 10, 2021.

The regular season will culminate with the 2020 WAC Men's Soccer Tournament, which will begin on April 14 and conclude on April 18, 2021.

Effects of the Covid-19 Pandemic 
As a result of the COVID-19 pandemic, the WAC postponed sports through the calendar year on August 13, 2020.

On November 4, 2020, the NCAA approved moving fall championships to the spring.

San Jose State announced that they will not have fans at home games.

Teams 
A total of 11 teams are due to take part in the conference this season.

Changes from last season 
The 2019 season was the last for both CSU Bakersfield and Kansas City as WAC members. On July 1, 2020, CSU Bakersfield joined the Big West Conference and Kansas City returned to the Summit League after a seven-year absence.

The WAC added a new member, as Dixie State joined from the Rocky Mountain Athletic Conference. They will be ineligible for the postseason until the 2024–25 season, as they will complete the four-year reclassification process.

Stadiums and locations

Matches

Non-conference

Conference

Matchday 1

Matchday 2

Matchday 3

Matchday 4

Matchday 5

Matchday 6

Matchday 7

Matchday 8

Matchday 9 

Matchday 10

Matchday 11 

Source:

References 

2020 NCAA Division I men's soccer season
 
2020 in American soccer
Association football events postponed due to the COVID-19 pandemic